Gallehvand (also Romanized as Galehband and Galleh Band) is a village in Borborud-e Gharbi Rural District, in the Central District of Aligudarz County, Lorestan Province, Iran. At the 2006 census, its population was 300, in 47 families.

References 

Towns and villages in Aligudarz County